The Miramichi Civic Centre is a 1,805-seat multi-purpose arena in Miramichi, New Brunswick. The arena opened in 1986 and is home to the Miramichi Timberwolves ice hockey team of the Maritime Junior Hockey League. The arena was built to replace the Sinclair Rink which burned down.

External links
History and pictures of venue

Buildings and structures in Miramichi, New Brunswick
Indoor arenas in New Brunswick
Indoor ice hockey venues in Canada
Sports venues in New Brunswick
1986 establishments in New Brunswick
Sports venues completed in 1986